The mixed doubles tournament of the 2013 BWF World Championships (World Badminton Championships) was held from August 5 to 11. Zhang Nan and Zhao Yunlei were the defending champions.

Tontowi Ahmad and Lilyana Natsir defeated Xu Chen and Ma Jin 21–13, 16–21, 22–20 in the final.

Seeds

  Xu Chen / Ma Jin (final)
  Zhang Nan / Zhao Yunlei (semifinals)
  Tantowi Ahmad / Lilyana Natsir (champion)
  Joachim Fischer Nielsen / Christinna Pedersen (third round)
  Chan Peng Soon / Goh Liu Ying (second round)
  Muhammad Rijal / Debby Susanto (quarter-finals)
  Sudket Prapakamol / Saralee Thoungthongkam (third round)
  Robert Mateusiak / Nadieżda Zięba (quarter-finals)

  Fran Kurniawan / Shendy Puspa Irawati (second round)
  Riky Widianto / Richi Puspita Dili (third round) 
  Yoo Yeon-seong / Jang Ye-na (quarter-finals)
  Michael Fuchs / Birgit Michels (second round)
  Anders Kristiansen / Julie Houmann (second round)
  Danny Bawa Chrisnanta / Vanessa Neo Yu Yan (second round)
  Qiu Zihan / Bao Yixin (second round)
  Chris Adcock / Gabrielle White (second round)

Draw

Finals

Section 1

Section 2

Section 3

Section 4

References
tournamentsoftware.com

2013 BWF World Championships
World Championships